Ayer Hitam, nicknamed Bandar Seramik ('Ceramic Town'), is a town in Batu Pahat District, Johor, Malaysia. Located just at the junction of Federal Route 1 and Federal Route 50, it is known for its many outlets selling pottery and other crafts. It also is one of the interchange for North–South Expressway.

History

Ayer Hitam simply means Black Water. A lively town, Ayer Hitam is always bustling with passing vehicles and people who travels north and south. This place is well known for its ceramic items such as flower vases in an assortment of colours, photo frames, jars, ashtrays, and other home decorative items. For a closer look, you can also watch the potters at work. Aside from quality souvenirs, Ayer Hitam is also dotted with many stalls selling local tidbits known as 'kerepek' among the locals. Amongst the famous ones are prawn crackers, steamed corn, tapioca chips, and the all-time must-try "otak-otak". These food items are fresh and prepacked for you, and sold at reasonable prices.

Located in the district of Batu Pahat. Before the advent of the North–South Expressway, Ayer Hitam was a major route intersection leading to Melaka and Kuala Lumpur going northbound, Johor Bahru going southbound, Kluang and Mersing going eastbound, and Batu Pahat going westbound. It was a popular rest stop for many tour buses and travellers between Singapore and Kuala Lumpur. Visitors could find souvenir shops, restaurants and locals peddling to sell their vegetables.

Place of interest 
Masjid Sultan Ibrahim, Ayer Hitam
Klinik Kesihatan Ayer Hitam
Pusat Pertanian Ayer Hitam
UK Farm, Jalan Batu Pahat-Kluang
Pu Zhao Buddhist Vihara

Education

Primary school
Sekolah Kebangsaan Seri Bandan
Sekolah Kebangsaan Kota Dalam
Sekolah Kebangsaan Air Hitam
Sekolah Jenis Kebangsaan (Cina) Malayan

Transportation

Road

Ayer Hitam has a PLUS Interchange located at the northern part of the town. The town is accessible by bus from Larkin Sentral in Johor Bahru.

References

Batu Pahat District